Little Harbour (East) is a local service district and designated place in the Canadian province of Newfoundland and Labrador on the Placentia Bay of the island of Newfoundland.

Geography 
Little Harbour (East) is in Newfoundland within Subdivision A of Division No. 1.

Demographics 

Government 
Little Harbour (East), Placentia Bay is a local service district (LSD) that is governed by a committee responsible for the provision of certain services to the community. The chair of the LSD committee is Marcella Hickey.

See also 
List of communities in Newfoundland and Labrador
List of designated places in Newfoundland and Labrador
List of local service districts in Newfoundland and Labrador

References 

Designated places in Newfoundland and Labrador
Local service districts in Newfoundland and Labrador